The Only Son is a lost 1914 American silent drama film directed by Oscar Apfel and Cecil B. DeMille. The film is based on the play of the same name by Winchell Smith and stars James Blackwell.

Cast
 James Blackwell as Thomas Brainerd, Sr.
 A. MacMillan as Henry Thompson
 Thomas W. Ross as Thomas Brainerd, Jr.
 Jane Darwell as Mrs. Brainerd
 Merta Carpenter as Gertrude Brainerd
 Arthur Collins as Jim Tompkins
 J.P. Wild as Charles Lester
 Fred Starr as Collins
 Milton Brown

References

External links

1914 films
1914 drama films
Silent American drama films
American black-and-white films
American silent feature films
American films based on plays
Famous Players-Lasky films
Films directed by Cecil B. DeMille
Films directed by Oscar Apfel
Films directed by Thomas N. Heffron
Films directed by William C. deMille
Lost American films
1914 lost films
Lost drama films
1910s American films